Sofi may refer to:

Sofi (mascot), the Mascot for 2010 ISF Women's World Championship
Sofi Marinova (born 1975), Bulgarian singer

SOFI may refer to:
Swedish Institute for Language and Folklore
Spray-On Foam Insulation, used on the Space Shuttle
Social finance, mobilizing investment capital to drive social progress
SoFi (Social Finance Inc.), an online personal finance company
Sofia Toufa (born 1983), also known by her stage name Sofi
South of Fifth, a neighborhood in Miami Beach, FL, also known as SOFI
SoFi Stadium, in Los Angeles, California
Super-resolution optical fluctuation imaging (SOFI), a technique for super-resolution microscopy